Tamar Yonah is an Israeli radio personality. Born in Orange County, California in 1961 she made Aliya (moved to Israel) in 1978.

Arutz Sheva and Voice of Israel 
In 2000 she joined Israel National Radio AKA Arutz Sheva as a show host and news broadcaster and later became program manager. Arutz Sheva broadcast without a license from somewhere in the Mediterranean, or actually off of the shores of Tel Aviv and was ultimately shut down by the Israeli government.  At which time Tamar migrated with many Arutz Sheva veterans to a new internet radio operation called Voice of Israel. The new platform lasted for about a year and also went under. After which Tamar launched her own Israel News Talk Radio - INTR.

Israel News Talk Radio 
Israel News Talk Radio is a web based streaming radio providing talk radio in English. Some shows are streamed live and all or archived and podcasts via SoundCloud and iTunes.

References

1961 births
Living people